Barrington is a minor suburb in the south of Christchurch, New Zealand, occasionally referred to as part of Spreydon. In 2006, the area was classified as a suburb by government organisations such as Statistics New Zealand for the purposes of the census, and divided into two areas named Barrington South and Barrington North. For the 2018 census, the area of Barrington was instead primarily included within the statistical area of Spreydon South.

History

The first European owner of the land was Captain Charles Simeon. In 1851, he chose  of land and had frontages with Wilderness Road, the road leading to the Heathcote River, and the road leading from Christchurch to Halswell. The land was numbered in the order of it having been chosen, and his land was thus known as Rural Section 154.

Simeon died in 1867 and his widow requested through land agents Richard J. S. Harman and Edward Cephas John Stevens that Wilderness Road be renamed Barrington Road in honour of her grandfather, Sir Fitzwilliam Barrington, 10th Baronet. This request was granted in 1885, and it is today known as Barrington Street.

Economy

Barrington Shopping Centre

Barrington Shopping Centre covers an area of 14,959 m2. It has 700 carparks and 52 retailers, including FreshChoice and The Warehouse.

References

Suburbs of Christchurch